Rajani, Rajni or Rajini is an Indian name that may refer to:

Given name
Rajani (actress) (born Shashi Kaur Malhotra), Indian film actress
Rajinikanth (born 1950), Indian film actor
Rajni Abbi, Indian lawyer and politician 
Rajni Bakshi, Indian freelance journalist and author
Rajni Basumatary, Indian actress, producer, writer and director
Rajani A. Bhisey (born 1941), Indian medical scientist
Rajani Duganna, Indian politician
Rajani Etimarpu (born 1990), Indian field hockey player
Rajani Kannepalli Kanth, American economist and philosopher
Rajani Kanta Barman (born 1979), Bangladeshi football defender
Rajani Kanta Patir (1917–?), Indian Administrative Service officer
Rajni Kothari (1928–2015), Indian political scientist, political theorist, academic and writer
Rajini Krishnan, Indian motorcycle racer
Rajni Kumar (1923–2022), British-born Indian educationist
Rajani Palme Dutt (1896–1974), British journalist and politician
Rajani Pandit, Indian private investigator
Rajni Patil (born 1958), Indian politician
Rajani Rai, Lieutenant Governor of Pondicherry, India
Rajni Ranjan Sahu, Indian politician
Rajni Razdan, Indian Administrative Service Officer
Rajni Shah, British performance artist, writer and producer
Rajini Thiranagama (1954–1989), Tamil human rights activist and feminist
Rajni Tiwari, Indian politician
Rajani Venugopal (born 1969), Indian cricketer

Surname
Bhisadej Rajani  (1920–2022), prince of Thailand
Jaimin Rajani, Singer-songwriter
Lavajibhai Rajani, Indian politician
Rakesh Rajani, Tanzanian civil society leader of Indian descent